Jaguar is a 1986 Soviet drama film directed by Sebastián Alarcón. Free film adaptation of Mario Vargas Llosa's novel The Time of the Hero.

Plot 
The hero is a cadet of a military school where future defenders of the Pinochet regime are trained. Having survived the collapse of the philosophy of cruelty, Jaguar (as the cadets called him for his firm and independent character) joins the ranks of fighters against the existing regime.

Cast 
 Sergey Veksler as Pablo the Jaguar 
 Artyom Kaminsky as Alberto Fernandez
 Adel Al-Khadad as Ricardo Orana
 Sergey Gazarov as Lieutenant Gamboa
 Yanina Khachaturova as Teresa
 Igor Vernik as Cava
 Vladimir Tatosov	as 	colonel
 Vsevolod Shilovsky as major
 Islam Kaziyev as Sergeant Pesoa
 Bakhram Akramov as Pitaluga
 Sergey Shkalikov as Boa

References

External links 
 

1986 films
1980s Russian-language films
Soviet drama films
1986 drama films
Mosfilm films 
Films based on Peruvian novels
Films about military personnel
Films about school violence
Films about the Chilean military dictatorship
Films set in Chile
Films based on works by Mario Vargas Llosa